Makeshift may refer to:

 "Makeshift" (Death Note episode), an episode of the anime series Death Note
 Makeshift (Transformers), any of several Transformers characters
 Makeshift Miracle, a surreal fantasy coming-of-age webcomic

See also 
 
 Interim (disambiguation)
 Substitute (disambiguation)